Smithfield (pop. 507) is a settlement in the Saramacca District of Suriname, about  north of the district capital, Groningen. It is named after plantation Smithfield. Staatsolie operates a yard in Sarah Maria near Smithfield.

References

Populated places in Saramacca District